Frédéric Advice-Desruisseaux (born 12 January 1983) is a French association football player who last played as a midfielder for SC Hazebrouck. He played professionally for Kidderminster Harriers, making nine appearances in League Two in the 2004–05 season.

References

Profile at Kidderminster Harriers' official website

1983 births
Living people
Footballers from Paris
French footballers
Lille OSC players
Kidderminster Harriers F.C. players
English Football League players
CS Avion players
ÉFC Fréjus Saint-Raphaël players
Rapid de Menton players
SC Hazebrouck players
Association football midfielders